Fantasies is the fourth studio album by Canadian indie rock band Metric. It was released on April 7, 2009. In the United States. it debuted at No. 1 on Billboard's Top Heatseekers, and peaked at No. 76 on the Billboard 200. As of October 2009 it had sold 76,000 copies in the United States according to Nielsen SoundScan. In Canada it debuted at No. 13 on the Canadian Albums Chart and peaked at No. 6. In Australia, the album debuted at No. 48.

Background 
The first single release from the album, "Help I'm Alive", was added to the iTunes Store on December 23, 2008 in Canada. The single is also available on 7" vinyl from their website, and was available on their "Jingle Bell Rock" tour in December 2008. On February 13, 2009, the album cover's image was added to the song "Help, I'm Alive" on their MySpace playlist. On February 28, 2009, the band added the song "Gimme Sympathy" to their MySpace playlist.

The album was available through their website, in vinyl, deluxe hardcover, digital, or deluxe bundle packages. There was a Limited Edition Package available at first that was limited to 500 copies, which has now sold out.

Metric opted to self-release the album.  The subsequent mainstream success of the album led The New York Times to use Metric as the central band in an article regarding the shrinking role of major labels in the music industry.

The song "Front Row" was featured on an episode of Grey's Anatomy, and released as a single on iTunes the same day. Frontwoman Emily Haines told Drowned in Sound that "Front Row" was inspired by the novel Great Jones Street by Don DeLillo.
"Gold Guns Girls" was featured in the movie Zombieland as well as in an episode of the TV show Entourage, in the EA Sports game FIFA 10, as the intro and closing credits of Totally Spies: The Movie. It was featured in the 2011 video game Test Drive Unlimited 2. "Help I'm Alive" was featured in an episode of The Vampire Diaries, and during the end credits of the 2009 movie Defendor.

The album was leaked, causing Metric to push the release date of the album forward one week to April 7.

The album was released on iTunes on March 31, 2009.

The song "Black Sheep" was recorded for the album, but was ultimately left off because they felt that it 'too obviously reflected the band's sound'. It has since been released on the soundtrack for Scott Pilgrim vs. the World.

Singles 
 "Help, I'm Alive" (December 23, 2008) (No. 21 CAN)
 "Front Row" (March 12, 2009) (No. 65 CAN)
 "Gimme Sympathy" (Radio promo only) (No. 52 CAN)
 "Sick Muse" (June 1, 2009)
 "Gold Guns Girls" (Radio promo only) (December 2009) (No. 88 CAN)
 "Stadium Love" (video released May 28, 2010)

Reception 

Reception to the album has been highly positive. It currently holds a 77 rating on Metacritic, from 29 reviews. Amazon.com listed Fantasies at eleventh in its "Best Albums of 2009" list. The single "Gimme Sympathy" has been popular among alternative rock radio stations.

The album was a shortlisted nominee for the 2009 Polaris Music Prize, and also won two Casby Awards on October 22, 2009; the NXNE favourite new indie release award and favourite new album award. Fantasies ranked at number 26 on Stereogum's Best Album 2009.

The album also reached platinum status in Canada selling over 80,000 copies. 
On April 18, 2010, the album won the Juno Award for Alternative Album of the Year at the 2010 Awards, as well as the band winning Group of the Year. As of 2012 it has sold 500,000 copies.

The album's song "Stadium Love" was named the official song of the Toronto Blue Jays for 2013. As of the 2014-15 NHL season, it was also the goal song for the Edmonton Oilers.

Track listing

Personnel 
 Emily Haines – synthesizers, vocals
 James Shaw – guitar, vocals
 Joshua Winstead – bass guitar
 Joules Scott-Key – drums

The album was produced by Gavin Brown and James Shaw and mixed by John O'Mahony.

Charts

Weekly charts

Year-end charts

References

2009 albums
Metric (band) albums
Mom + Pop Music albums
Juno Award for Alternative Album of the Year albums
Albums produced by Gavin Brown (musician)
Albums recorded at Electric Lady Studios
Albums recorded at Metalworks Studios